Myśliwiec may refer to:
Myśliwiec, Kuyavian-Pomeranian Voivodeship

People with the surname
Andrzej Myśliwiec (born 1957), Polish field hockey player
Karol Myśliwiec (born 1943), Polish egyptologist
Piotr Myśliwiec (born 1952), Polish diplomat and chemist

Polish-language surnames